Oscar Meneses (born 12 May 1977) is a Guatemalan sprinter. He competed in the men's 100 metres at the 2000 Summer Olympics.

References

1977 births
Living people
Athletes (track and field) at the 2000 Summer Olympics
Guatemalan male sprinters
Olympic athletes of Guatemala
Athletes (track and field) at the 1999 Pan American Games
Pan American Games competitors for Guatemala
Competitors at the 2002 Central American and Caribbean Games
Place of birth missing (living people)